An autonomous territorial unit (ATU;) is an administrative division of Moldova. 

Originally, Gagauzia was the only such unit. 

In 2005, Moldovan law also recognized the Administrative-Territorial Units of the Left Bank of the Dniester. The latter is under the de facto control of the Pridnestrovian Moldavian Republic (PMR, commonly known as Transnistria), a self-proclaimed state operating outside the jurisdiction of the Moldovan government.

References

Autonomous administrative divisions
Territories